The following highways are numbered 669:

United States